Sciota barteli is a species of snout moth in the genus Sciota. It was described by Aristide Caradja in 1910. It is found in Kazakhstan.

References

External links
lepiforum.de

Moths described in 1910
Phycitini
Moths of Asia
Taxa named by Aristide Caradja